David Powers is a fictional character from the 1987 film The Lost Boys portrayed by Kiefer Sutherland. In the film David is initially believed to be the main antagonist of the film, being the head of a gang of vampires in the fictional town of Santa Carla, but he is later revealed to have simply been an underling of Max.

The character and Sutherland's performance were well received upon the film's release, and David has gone on to become regarded as an iconic villain in popular culture, having inspired the depiction of vampires both in style as well as characterization since. Analysis of his personality and psychology range from focus on his status as an eternal youth, gang leader, murderer and implied homoerotic tendencies.

Appearances

Film
David is initially portrayed as the main antagonist of the film and is the head of a gang of vampires in the fictional town of Santa Carla. He is later revealed to have simply been an underling of Max, who was the real head vampire.

Literature
David appears in the same role in the 1980s novelization of the film.

Comics
David appears in the comic Lost Boys: Reign of Frogs and in 2016's The Lost Boys.

Television
In 2020 it was announced that a television series based on the character and the rest of the vampire gang is in production at The CW, focusing on the gang of vampires throughout different points in history. Dakota Shapiro was cast in the role for the first pilot, but was replaced with Lincoln Younes and the character renamed "Benjamin" for the second pilot.

Fictional character biography

Not much is known about David's life before becoming a vampire. At some point, he was sired by Max (Edward Herrmann) and went on to create his own gang of subordinates (Brooke McCarter, Billy Wirth and Alex Winter). The audience is introduced to David through the eyes of Michael Emerson (Jason Patric), and Michael's fascination with a girl named Star (Jami Gertz), whom David appears to be in a relationship with. The next day Michael meets with Star again and is provoked by David in participating in a dangerous motorcycle race. Michael is then lured back to David's lair where he undergoes an unsettling initiation before unknowingly drinking blood and becoming a vampire. The gang each hangs off the underside of an elevated train and dive off individually. Michael then loses his grip and falls off, waking up in his bed.

Michael attempts to confront David about his newly discovered vampirism, who in turn takes Michael to attack a group of Surf Nazis at a bonfire, hoping to prompt him into killing. Michael however grows uncomfortable and horrified and returns home to his brother, Sam (Corey Haim), who has become friends with a pair of self-proclaimed vampire hunters, Edgar and Alan Frog (Corey Feldman and Jamison Newlander). Star appears to Michael and reveals that she is a half-vampire as well, and David had intended for Michael to be her first kill, turning her into a full vampire. Michael leads Sam, Edgar, and Alan to the vampire lair during the daytime while they are hibernating, which results in the death of one of David's underlings - Marko (Alex Winter). The group only barely escapes as David's hand comes into brief contact with sunlight, while the group escapes with Star and Laddie (Chance Michael Corbitt), another half-vampire child.

That evening, Michael and Sam's mother, Lucy (Dianne Wiest) goes on a date with Max, and her father (Barnard Hughes) is out of the house, leading to the perfect opportunity for Michael, Sam, Edgar and Alan to arm themselves to face the vampires. The vampires attack, leading to the deaths of Paul (Brooke McCarter) and Dwayne (Billy Wirth). David and Michael face off, which ends with David being impaled on deer antlers, leaving his final fate unknown.

Reception

Kiefer Sutherland's suave and mysterious portrayal of David was widely acclaimed as a scene stealer throughout the film. David has been recognized as one of the most iconic film villains from the 1980s and one of the most recognizable vampires in film history. Film critic Colin Houlson stated that Sutherland "is moody and seductively scary as David".

Analysis
Jeffrey Weinstock expressed in his book The Vampire Film: Undead Cinema that David (much like many male vampire characters) is a gender stereotype of a male, always performing and trying to "pass" as a human, and in David's case almost to the point of parody.

Homoerotic interpretation
David, and particularly his interactions with the character Michael, has been read as homoerotic, even Sutherland has nodded to these themes, remarking that the "whole scene where I catch [Michael] in the fog coming off the bridge ... I mean, it's a very sensual moment!" Harry Benshoff in his book Monsters in the Closet: Homosexuality and the Horror Film states that with his bleach-blond hair, stubble, earrings and leather attire David appears as a gay pin-up model. He interprets the story of the film being that of the "normal" teen Michael being seduced by David's lifestyle. Psychoanalyst Trevor C. Pederson describes David's attempts at recruiting Michael as "obsessive", noting that David even requests that Michael join him even after Michael and his friends have killed all of David's fellow vampires.

Legacy
The image of David showing his fangs for the first time has been picked as the cover for several books, such as John Kenneth Muir's Horror Films of the 1980s and The Vampire Book: The Encyclopedia of the Undead by J Gordon Melton.

Joss Whedon has expressed that the character Spike on the television series Buffy the Vampire Slayer was inspired by David. Both David and Spike took visual inspiration from British punk rock icon Billy Idol. Sutherland has stated that Billy Idol was a main source of inspiration for the look of David, while Spike was directly referenced the episode "Sleeper", where the characters state that Idol took the idea for his look from Spike.

The character became the eponymous vampire to people of the generation the film came out. This can be observed in a meme where he is seen killing the character Edward Cullen from the Twilight series, reflecting the resentment of vampire fans who feel characters like Edward have "ruined" what was once cool about vampires to audiences, which David stood for.

In popular culture
David's character was spoofed on the television show Bloopers after the release of the film.

References

Further reading
 Encyclopedia of the Vampire: The Living Dead in Myth, Legend, and Popular Culture
 The Enduring Lure of the Vampire: Sadomasochistic Subtexts in Postmodern America
 Vampire Taxonomy: Identifying and Interacting with the Modern-Day Bloodsucker
 The Vampire Gallery: A Who's who of the Undead
 Zombies, Vampires, and Philosophy: New Life for the Undead
 The Changing Vampire of Film and Television: A Critical Study of the Growth of a Genre
 A Field Guide to Monsters
 The Undead Among Us - The Figure of the Vampire as the "Unknown Other" and Its Representation in "True Blood"
 Blood Read: The Vampire as Metaphor in Contemporary Culture
 The Lure of the Vampire: Gender, Fiction and Fandom from Bram Stoker to Buffy
 The Vampire Film: From Nosferatu to Interview with the Vampire
 Consuming Youth: Technologies of Desire and American Youth Culture

The Lost Boys (franchise)
LGBT themes in horror fiction
Male horror film villains
Fictional vampires
Film characters introduced in 1987
Fictional henchmen
Fictional cult leaders